The 2013 Union Budget of India was presented by Finance Minister, P. Chidambaram on 28 February 2013, 11 AM.

Salient features of the budget
Total expenditure of 
Planned defence expenditure of 
Education expenditure of  
 was allocated for Ministry of Health & Family Welfare in the financial year 2014.
 allocated to Minority Affairs Ministry.
 allocated for medical education and research.
 Setting up a National Institute for Sports to train coaches in Patiala Punjab at a cost of

Personal tax
It is also mentioned that this tax has been implied only for this financial year and may be withdrawn from next year onwards.
 No changes in personal income tax slabs. But a special redemption of Rs. 2,000 has been given for income group between Rs. 2 to 5 Lakhs.

References

Union budgets of India
2013 in Indian economy
India